The "Kamangiri art" or Kamangiri bhint chitro is a form of mural painting commissioned  primarily in Kutch region of Indian state of Gujarat as well as some regions of Pakistan.

Origin
The Persian term Kaman stands for Bow and one theory of etymology refers to the earliest painters of the art belonging to a category of Bow makers who were primarily Muslims and had migrated to the Kutch region in 18th century, the period which is contemporaneous to the emergence of this art form.

However there are other tradition as well and according to one such tradition the word "Kamangiri" has roots in the word Kaam, in kutchi dialect which stands for work. This tradition describes the Kamangars as the class performing any kind of art work and most probably the painting. The class of painters initially remained Muslims by faith but later absorbed Hindu artists from 'Gujjar Sutar' and 'Rupgada Salat' communities as well. The Kamangars are said to be proficient in the architectural works apart from their proficiency in Bow making and Shield making. The work of the Kamangars influenced other communities in the region as well. Some of these include the "Soni" community, who worked on gold and silver and were associated with making of ornaments while the other being " Mochi" community of the leather workers, and ivory carvers.

There were two kinds of Kamangars. One worked with the masons to paint on the walls while the another category of Kamangars produced scrolls and painting on paper for the ruling class. Apart from Jain and Bhatias of Gujarat the other communities who patronised them were Jadeja Rajputs and "Mistry" community. The Kamangars despite their artistic excellence, were not given proper importance in the society and once the contract was over they resorted to the traditional works like "toy making".

Features
The most common theme  of painting remained religious motifs based primarily upon the folk tales of Ramayana and Life of Krishna. But, the themes varied according to the period, place as well as choice of the patron. The Kamangiri art work is though found across various region of Kutch but the notable ones are at Anjar, Mundra, Bharpar, Tera, Lala, Faradi, Bibber and Varapadhhar. Some of these sites were damaged due to the 2001 earthquake, resulting in the loss of many of these paintings. The painting of inner and outer wall was the most recurrent theme of the art though later the figures like those of British soldiers with their Dogs and of Aeroplanes, Railway engines, domestic animals and events from Jain mythology were also painted. 

One of the notable painting still preserved today is of the house of Captain MacMurdo at "Anjar", which depicts the royal procession, Hindu god and goddesses and flora and fauna in the Kutchi background. At Hajapar village in Kutchh the train is painted with a railway station in the background while at Tera, a small principality in kutchh have the four walls of a bedroom on the upper floor of castle decorated with the themes of epic Ramayana.In India no other place has the depiction of complete story of Ramayana at a single place in such a continuous manner.

The Ram Mandir at Bibber village features the combination of the style of Rajasthan and Gujarat. The places like Deshalpar village near Mundra has the paintings depicting "Rasa mandala", a circle dance performed mainly by the worshippers of Krishna.The Kamangars were illiterate but they showed  the extent of their knowledge at the palace of "Kalubhai Waghela" in Muntra town where the depiction of royal procession, European Captain, the scene of "Gopi Vastra Haran" from Bhagavata Purana and Ramayana are found.

Kamangars have also painted on paper, wood, glass and hide. The famous scrolls from Aina Mahal and Kachchh Museum at Bhuj are painted by the Kamangars. One of the Scroll depicts the Tajia procession which is taken out during Muharram while another one depicts the process carried out during Nag Panchami, to commemorate the victory of Kachh army over Gujarat army.

Decline
The Kamangiri art was popular till 20th century but after the great depression, the patrons moved out of the Kutch and the houses were locked down turning the Kamangirs to other means of livelihood.Another fatal blow to the art was 2001 earthquake, which devastated some of the notable works.Now, only three places in Gujarat has well preserved Kamangiri murals.These are "Tera fort", MacMurdo bungalow at Anjar and the house of Kalubhai Waghela in "Mundra".

See also
Madhubani Painting
Warli Painting

References

Indian painting
Schools of Indian painting
Culture of Kutch